The 2022 UT Arlington Mavericks baseball team represented the University of Texas at Arlington during the 2022 NCAA Division I baseball season. The Mavericks played their home games at Clay Gould Ballpark and were led by fifteenth-year head coach Darin Thomas. They were members of the Sun Belt Conference.

Preseason

Signing Day Recruits
Source:

Sun Belt Conference Coaches Poll
The Sun Belt Conference Coaches Poll was released on February 9, 2022. UT Arlington was picked to finish fifth with 78 votes.

Preseason All-Sun Belt Team & Honors
No players from the Mavericks were chosen.

Personnel

Schedule and results

Schedule Source:
*Rankings are based on the team's current ranking in the D1Baseball poll.

References

UT Arlington
UT Arlington Mavericks baseball seasons
UT Arlington Mavericks baseball